40 Years of Rocky: The Birth of a Classic, also known as Becoming Rocky: The Birth of a Classic, is a 2020 American short documentary film directed by Derek Wayne Johnson about the making of the original Rocky.

Story 
The film tells the story of Sylvester Stallone and the creation of the first Rocky film when he was an unknown actor. It is narrated by Sylvester Stallone as he takes the audience through rare and never-before-seen home movies, rehearsal footage and behind the scenes footage, giving insight into how the low budget fan-favorite film was made.

Cast
The film is narrated by Stallone with archive footage starring the Rocky cast, including Talia Shire, Burt Young, Carl Weathers and Burgess Meredith.

Production
Talking about the making of the film, Johnson describes how the series of events conspired that meant he was hand picked by Stallone to create this documentary.

Distribution 
40 Years of Rocky: The Birth of a Classic was originally acquired by MGM for their streaming platform Epix, but has also been subsequently released on Transactional Video on Demand platforms Amazon and iTunes in the US and Canada by Virgil Films and as Becoming Rocky: The Birth of a Classic internationally by Branded Studios.

Reception

References

External links 
 
 

2020 films
2020 short documentary films
American short documentary films
Documentary films about films
Rocky (film series) mass media
Documentary films about boxing
2020s English-language films
2020s American films